Hypericum polyphyllum is a species of flowering plant in the family Hypericaceae which is native to Turkey, Lebanon, and Syria.

References

polyphyllum
Flora of Turkey